OW2 Orchestra is open source software for orchestration of web services.

It is WS-BPEL 2.0 compliant. It organizes web services calls following a process description written in the BPEL XML grammar. It has a graphical editor and an administration console.

Features
 Supports WS-BPEL 2.0 specifications
 Supports several communication layers: one based on Axis (Web Services http transport) and another one based on the CXF
 Distribution package as OSGi bundle
 Hot-deployment of processes
 API to administrate and monitor processes, instances and messages
 Web 2.0 Administration Console

Programming tools